Elmer Gantry is a satirical novel written by Sinclair Lewis in 1926 that presents aspects of the religious activity of America in fundamentalist and evangelistic circles and the attitudes of the 1920s public toward it. Reverend Dr. Elmer Gantry, the protagonist, is attracted by drinking, making easy money (but he eventually renounces tobacco and alcohol) and chasing women. After various forays into evangelism, he becomes a successful Methodist minister despite his hypocrisy and serial sexual indiscretions.

Elmer Gantry was published in the United States by Harcourt Trade Publishers in March 1927, dedicated by Lewis to the American journalist and satirist H. L. Mencken.

Background
Lewis researched the novel by observing the work of various preachers in Kansas City in his so-called "Sunday School" meetings on Wednesdays. He first worked with William L. "Big Bill" Stidger, pastor of the Linwood Boulevard Methodist Episcopal Church in Kansas City, Missouri. Stidger introduced Lewis to many other clergymen, including the Reverend Leon Milton Birkhead, a Unitarian and an agnostic. Lewis preferred the liberal Birkhead to the conservative Stidger, and on his second visit to Kansas City, Lewis chose Birkhead as his guide. Other Kansas City ministers Lewis interviewed included Burris Jenkins, Earl Blackman, I. M. Hargett, Bert Fiske, and Robert Nelson Horatio Spencer, who was rector of Grace and Holy Trinity Church, which is now the cathedral of the Episcopal Diocese of West Missouri.
Lewis finished the book while mending a broken leg on Jackfish Island in Rainy Lake, Minnesota.

The character of Sharon Falconer was based on events in the career of the radio evangelist Aimee Semple McPherson, who founded the Pentecostal Christian denomination known as the International Church of the Foursquare Gospel in 1927.

Synopsis
The novel tells the story of a young, narcissistic, womanizing college athlete who abandons his early ambition to become a lawyer. The legal profession does not suit the unethical Gantry. After college, he attends a Baptist seminary, and he is ordained as a Baptist minister. While managing to hide certain sexual indiscretions, he is thrown out of the seminary before completing his bachelor of divinity because he is too drunk to attend a church where he is supposed to preach. After several years as a travelling salesman of farm equipment, he becomes manager for Sharon Falconer, an itinerant evangelist. Gantry becomes her lover, but loses both her and his position when she is killed in a fire at her new tabernacle. After this catastrophe, he briefly acts as a "New Thought" evangelist, and eventually becomes a Methodist minister. He marries well and eventually obtains a large congregation in Lewis's fictional city of Zenith. During his career, Gantry contributes to the downfall, physical injury, and even death of key people around him, including Frank Shallard, a sincere minister, who is plagued by doubt. Especially ironic is the way he champions love, an emotion he seems incapable, in his sermons, preaches against ambition, when he is so patently ambitious, and organizes crusades against (mainly sexual) immorality, when he has difficulty resisting sexual temptations.

Reception
On publication in 1927, Elmer Gantry created a public furor. The book was banned in Boston and other cities and denounced from pulpits across the United States. One cleric suggested that Lewis should be imprisoned for five years, and there were also threats of physical violence against the author. Evangelist Billy Sunday called Lewis "Satan's cohort". 

However, the book was a commercial success. It was the best-selling work of fiction in America for the year 1927, according to Publishers Weekly.

Mark Schorer, then of the University of California, Berkeley, notes: "The forces of social good and enlightenment as presented in Elmer Gantry are not strong enough to offer any real resistance to the forces of social evil and banality." Schorer also says that, while researching the book, Lewis attended two or three church services every Sunday while in Kansas City, and that: "He took advantage of every possible tangential experience in the religious community." The result is a novel that satirically represents the religious activity of America in evangelistic circles and the attitudes of the 1920s toward it.

Shortly after the publication of Elmer Gantry, H. G. Wells published a widely syndicated newspaper article titled "The New American People", in which he largely based his observations of American culture on Lewis' novels.

Elmer Gantry appears as a minor character in two later, lesser-known Lewis novels: The Man Who Knew Coolidge and Gideon Planish. George Babbitt, the namesake of one of Lewis' better-known novels, appears in Elmer Gantry briefly during an encounter at the Zenith Athletic Club.

Adaptations
There have been five adaptations of the novel.

 A Broadway play by Patrick Kearney opened on August 7, 1928 at the Playhouse Theatre, where it ran for 48 performances. The cast included Edward J. Pawley (later of Big Town fame) as Elmer Gantry and Vera Allen as Sister Sharon Falconer.
 The 1960 film of the same name starring Burt Lancaster as Gantry and Jean Simmons as Sister Sharon Falconer.
 A 1970 Broadway musical adaptation, titled Gantry, opened and closed on the same night, February 14, 1970.
 In November 2007, an opera, also titled Elmer Gantry, by Robert Aldridge and Herschel Garfein, premiered in the James K. Polk Theater in Nashville, Tennessee.

Citations

General bibliography 
 John Tyler Blake, Sinclair Lewis's Kansas City Laboratory: The Genesis of Elmer Gantry. Ann Arbor: UMI, 1999. 
 Nelson Manfred Blake, "How to Learn History from Sinclair Lewis and Other Uncommon Sources", American Character and Culture in a Changing World: Some Twentieth-Century Perspectives. John A. Hague (ed.). Westport, CT: Greenwood, 1979. 111–23. 
 Robert Gibson Corder, Ph.D., Edward J. Pawley: Broadway's Elmer Gantry, Radio's Steve Wilson, and Hollywood's Perennial Bad Guy, Outskirts Press, 2006. 
 Wheeler Dixon, "Cinematic Adaptations of the Works of Sinclair Lewis", Sinclair Lewis at 100: Papers Presented at a Centennial Conference., ed. Michael Connaughton. St. Cloud, MN: St. Cloud State University, 1985, pp. 191–200. 
 Robert J. Higgs. "Religion and Sports: Three Muscular Christians in American Literature", American Sport Culture: The Humanistic Dimensions Wiley Lee Umphlett (ed.). Lewisburg: Bucknell University Press, 1985, pp. 226–34. 
 James M. Hutchisson, The Rise of Sinclair Lewis, 1920–1930. University Park: Penn State University Press, 1996. 
 George Killough, "Elmer Gantry, Chaucer's Pardoner, and the Limits of Serious Words". Sinclair Lewis: New Essays in Criticism. James M. Hutchisson (ed.). Troy, New York: Whitston, 1997. 162–74. 
 Richard R. Lingeman, Sinclair Lewis: Rebel from Main Street, Minnesota Historical Society Press, 2005, .
 Edward A. Martin, "The Mimic as Artist: Sinclair Lewis". H. L. Mencken and the Debunkers. Athens, Georgia: University of Georgia Press, 1984. 115–38. 
 Gary H. Mayer, "Love is More Than the Evening Star: A Semantic Analysis of Elmer Gantry and The Man Who Knew Coolidge", American Bypaths: Essays in Honor of E. Hudson Long. Ed. Robert G. Collmer and Jack W. Herring. Waco: Baylor University Press, 1980. 145–66. 
 James Benedict Moore, "The Sources of Elmer Gantry". The New Republic, 143 (8 August 1960): 17–18.
 Edward J. Piacentino, "Babbittry Southern Style: T. S. Stribling's Unfinished Cathedral". Markham Review 10 (1981): 36–39.
 Elizabeth S. Prioleau, "The Minister and the Seductress in American Fiction: The Adamic Myth Reduz", Journal of American Culture, 16.4 (1993): 1–6.
 Mark Schorer, Sinclair Lewis: An American Life, 1961, McGraw-Hill. .
 Mark Schorer, "Afterword", Elmer Gantry, Signet Books edition, 1970. 
 Edward Shillito, "Elmer Gantry and the Church in America", Nineteenth Century and After, 101 (1927): 739–48.

External links
 
 
 
 
 
 
 "Elmer Gantry, a Flawed Preacher for the Ages", All Things Considered (February 22, 2008). NPR.

1927 American novels
American novels adapted into films
American novels adapted into plays
American satirical novels
Books critical of Christianity
Censored books
Harcourt (publisher) books
Novels adapted into operas
Novels by Sinclair Lewis
Novels set in Missouri